Guvaka may refer to any of the following Indian kings:

 Guvaka I
 Guvaka II